The Assyrian Confederation of Europe (ACE) is a European umbrella organisation for Assyrian national federations and organisations in Europe.  It was formed on 22 April 2016 in Brussels, Belgium. The Brussels office was opened in April 2018.  ACE works to connect and represent half a million Europeans of Assyrian descent.

History

Assyrian communities have been present in Europe since the 1920s. After the genocide of 1915 in then Ottoman Turkey and in search for safer place to live, some Assyrians fled to Europe, in southern France (Marseille and Toulouse).   
The exodus from their land of origin, known historically as Assyria, has not stopped since then. It has even accelerated in recent years due to the general turmoil in the Middle East with all the risks it implies (kidnappings, ethnic cleansing and targeted killings).

The longstanding idea of setting up a pan-European umbrella for Assyrian organisations was materialised in 2016. The establishment of ACE was formally announced in the European parliament in Brussels on 22 April.

The organization is the European counterpart of the United States-based Assyrian Policy Institute, with whom the ACE regularly cooperates.

Aims

ACE is mainly dedicated to three aims:
 Promotion of Assyrian identity and culture in Europe
 Representation of Assyrians of Europe in politics and media
 Support for efforts in Assyria for democracy and equal rights

Members

 Fédération des Assyriens de Belgique (Original Member)
 Zentralverband der Assyrischen Vereinigungen in Deutschland und Europäischen Sektionen e.V. (Original Member)
 Assyriska Riksförbundet Sverige (Original Member)
 Assyrische Federatie Nederland (Joined in October 2016)

See also
Assyrian Policy Institute
History of the Assyrian people
Assyrian people
Assyrians in Belgium

References

External links
Official Website

Organisations based in Brussels
International nongovernmental organizations
Human rights organisations based in Belgium
Assyrian diaspora in Europe
Organizations established in 2016